The Breach is a 1970 film written and directed by Claude Chabrol, based on the novel The Balloon Man by Charlotte Armstrong.  The film was also known as The Breakup at times in its release in the United States. The film had a total of 927,678 admissions in France.

Plot
Hélène Régnier's (Audran) mentally ill husband Charles (Drouot) injures their son, Michel, in a violent rage. Hélène beats Charles to the floor with a frying pan, flees and starts divorce proceedings. Charles moves back in with his wealthy and manipulative parents, who never approved of his marriage and are determined to secure custody of Michel. While the boy is recovering in a local hospital, Hélène moves to a boarding house nearby. The Régniers hire Paul Thomas (Cassel), an impoverished family acquaintance, to find damaging material on Hélène to help them secure custody. Paul moves into the boarding house and, with the help of his girlfriend Sonia (Rouvel), plots to ruin Hélène's reputation.

Principal cast

Critical reception
Vincent Canby of The New York Times:

Dave Kerr of The Chicago Reader:

References

External links 

1970 films
1970s psychological drama films
1970s psychological thriller films
Films directed by Claude Chabrol
Films shot in Belgium
Films shot in Paris
French thriller drama films
French psychological thriller films
French psychological drama films
Italian psychological thriller films
Italian psychological drama films
Italian thriller drama films
Films based on American novels
Films based on works by Charlotte Armstrong
1970 drama films
1970s French-language films
1970s Italian films
1970s French films